Plectromerus is a genus of beetles in the subfamily Cerambycinae, and sole member of the tribe Plectromerini. It contains the following species:

 Plectromerus acunai (Fisher, 1936)
 Plectromerus bidentatus Fisher, 1942
 Plectromerus dentipes (Olivier, 1790)
 Plectromerus dezayasi Nearns & Branham, 2008
 Plectromerus distinctus (Cameron, 1910)
 Plectromerus dominicanus (Micheli, 1983)
 Plectromerus exis Zayas, 1975
 Plectromerus fasciatus (Gahan, 1895)
 Plectromerus femoratus (Fabricius, 1792)
 Plectromerus giesberti Nearns & Branham, 2008
 †Plectromerus grimaldii Nearns & Branham, 2005
 Plectromerus hovorei Nearns & Branham, 2008
 Plectromerus josephi Nearns & Branham, 2008
 Plectromerus lingafelteri Micheli & Nearns, 2005
 Plectromerus louisantoini Dalens & Touroult, 2007
 Plectromerus michelii Nearns & Branham, 2008
 Plectromerus morrisi Nearns & Branham, 2008
 Plectromerus navassae Nearns & Steiner, 2006
 Plectromerus ornatus Fisher, 1947
 Plectromerus pinicola Zayas, 1975
 Plectromerus pseudoexis Vitali & Haxaire, 2007
 Plectromerus pumilus Cazier & Lacey, 1952
 Plectromerus ramosi Micheli & Nearns, 2005
 Plectromerus roncavei Nearns & Miller, 2009
 Plectromerus serratus (Cameron, 1910)
 †Plectromerus tertiarius Vitali, 2005
 Plectromerus thomasi Nearns & Branham, 2008
 Plectromerus turnbowi Nearns & Branham, 2008
 Plectromerus unidentatus Fisher, 1942
 Plectromerus wappesi Giesbert, 1985

References

Cerambycinae